The Lucknow–Kasganj Passenger (55325/55326) is a passenger train belonging to Indian Railways' North Eastern Railway zone that runs between Lucknow Junction railway station and Kasganj Junction railway station in India. Currently it is running all days in a week.

Schedule 
The 55325 AF Lucknow - Kasganj Passenger leaves Lucknow on all days in a week at 04:30 hrs IST and reaches the Kasganj at 14:45 hrs IST. Total journey time: 10 hrs and 15 minutes.

Route and halts 

Manak Nagar railway station
Amausi railway station
Piparsand railway station
Harauni railway station
Jaitipur railway station
Kusumbhi railway station
Ajgain railway station
Sonik railway station
Unnao Junction railway station
Magarwara railway station
Kanpur Bridge Left Bank railway station
Kanpur Central railway station
Kanpur Anwarganj railway station
Rawatpur railway station
Kalianpur railway station
Mandhana Junction railway station
Chaubepur railway station
Barrajpur railway station
Utripura railway station
Dhaursalar railway station
Bilhaur railway station
Bakothikhas railway station
Araul Makanpur railway station
Gangawapur Halt railway station
Mani Mau railway station
Kannauj railway station
Kannauj City railway station
Jalalpur Panwara railway station
Jasoda railway station
Khudlapur railway station
GursahaiGanj railway station
Malikpur railway station
Khudaganj railway station
Singhirampur railway station
KamalGanj railway station
Yaqutganj railway station
Fatehgarh railway station
Farrukhabad Junction railway station
Harsingpur Goba railway station
Shukarullahpur railway station
Shamsabad railway station
Bhatasa railway station
Kaimganj railway station
Kampil Road railway station
Rudain railway station
Ballupur railway station
Daryaogonj railway station
Narthar railway station
Patiali railway station
Ganj Dundwara railway station
Garkha railway station
Sahawar Town railway station
Badhari Kalan railway station

References 

Passenger trains originating from Lucknow
North Eastern Railway zone